Visa requirements for Papua New Guinean citizens are administrative entry restrictions by the authorities of other states placed on citizens of Papua New Guinea. As of 2 July 2019, Papua New Guinean citizens had visa-free or visa on arrival access to 82 countries and territories, ranking the Papua New Guinean passport 64th in terms of travel freedom according to the Henley Passport Index.

Visa requirements map

Visa requirements

Dependent, Disputed, or Restricted territories
Unrecognized or partially recognized countries

Dependent and autonomous territories

APEC Business Travel Card

Holders of an APEC Business Travel Card (ABTC)  travelling on business do not require a visa to the following countries:

1 – up to 90 days
2 – up to 60 days
3 – up to 59 days

The card must be used in conjunction with a passport and has the following advantages:
undertake legitimate business in participating economies
expedited border crossing in all member economies, including transitional members
expedited scheduling of visa interview (United States)

See also

Visa policy of Papua New Guinea
Papua New Guinean passport

References and Notes
References

Notes

Papua New Guinea
Foreign relations of Papua New Guinea